Lady Selborne is a settlement located near Pretoria. It is in Gauteng province. It was established in 1905 as an area where anyone could buy and own land. As apartheid took hold the authorities eventually found a rationale for removing the residents and the houses were bulldozed in 1963.

In 2017 the place was being reformed and former residents were claiming reparation of their lands.

History 
Since 1905 Lady Selborne had been an area where the native people were allowed to legally own land. It was named for Maud Palmer, Countess of Selborne. The suburb was useful as it supplied cheap labour to Pretoria's white residents. In 1942 22,000 people were living there. However the area was too popular for the liking of the authorities, but they struggled to find a legal basis under the Group Areas Act for seizing the land as the residents had freehold properties. 
The last family to leave was in 1984. Lady Selborne was bulldozed away during the apartheid era in 1963. 

The Restitution of Land Rights Act 22 became law in 1994 and this entitles former owners to reclaim their property. Reparations have seen some of the historic occupants reclaiming their land despite local opposition. Many however have taken compensation, as they lack the funds to build on the land.

In 2019, 150 people claimed that they were owners of property in the former town. They took the authorities to court demanding that they should each be allowed to buy a plot for 43,000 Rand. The judge ordered the court be adjourned for two months while the evidence associated with each of their cases could be tested.

Notable residents 

 Ebrahim "Boetie" Abramjee MP lived
 Yusuf Abramjee was born here in 1963/4
 Jody Kollapen, judge was born here on 19 May 1957
 William Frederick Nkomo practiced in Lady Selborne
 Seputla Sebogodi actor and singer was born here in 1962.
 Hannah Stanton was at the women's mission here before her arrest
 Lefifi Tladi, the artist and musician was born here in 1949.

References 

Townships in Gauteng